Radius is an alternative rock band from Los Angeles, California that has been compared to Coldplay, U2, Snow Patrol, & Wallflowers.
2006 - 2008 Songs by Radius have been licensed for use in nationally broadcast Victoria's Secret television commercials, WB's TV show One Tree Hill, the NBC primetime show Las Vegas and several network television shows and movies on NBC, ABC, CBS, and syndicated programs. June 2009, Radius signed a production contract with acclaimed producer Stephen Short. The band recorded six songs produced by Stephen Short at Sonic Ranch Studios in El Paso, Texas. The band released the six songs on an EP titled Crossing Over in November 2009. In November 2009, Radius song "My World" was nominated for best rock song at the Hollywood Music Awards.

That same month, "My World" was featured in PBS special speaking out about the Chernobyl Children's Project International.
Radius went on a tour through Canada with multi-platinum recording artist Everclear in April 2010.

September 2010 Radius began working with producer and world class mixing engineer David J. Holman. Holman is best known for his work with multi-platinum artist  Olivia Newton-John, No Doubt Tragic Kingdom, Bush albums Sixteen Stone and Razorblade Suitcase, Adema, and Sick Puppies. Holman discovered Radius while the band was performing at the House of Blues Disney in Anaheim, California August 2010. Holman co-produced Radius song "Just Say" fall of 2010 and the song was released November 2010.

Summer 2011, Radius began working on their first full-length release. Projected release date is in January 2012.

Musical groups from Los Angeles